The University of Otago is a public research collegiate university based in Dunedin, Otago, New Zealand. Founded in 1869, Otago is New Zealand’s oldest University and one of the oldest universities in Oceania.

The university was created by a committee led by Thomas Burns, and officially established by an ordinance of the Otago Provincial Council in 1869. Between 1874 and 1961 the University of Otago was a part of the federal University of New Zealand, and issued degrees in its name.

Otago is known for its vibrant student life, particularly its flatting, which is often in old houses. Otago students have a long-standing tradition of naming their flats. The nickname for Otago students "Scarfie" comes from the habit of wearing a scarf during the cold southern winters. The university's graduation song, Gaudeamus igitur, iuvenes dum sumus ("Let us rejoice, while we are young"), acknowledges students will continue to live up to the challenge, if not always in the way intended. The university's student magazine, Critic, is New Zealand's longest running student magazine.

The university's architectural grandeur and accompanying gardens led to it being ranked as one of the world's most beautiful university campuses by the British newspaper The Daily Telegraph and American online news website The Huffington Post.

History

The Otago Association's plan for the European settlement of southern New Zealand, conceived under the principles of Edward Gibbon Wakefield in the 1840s, envisaged a university.

Dunedin leaders Thomas Burns and James Macandrew urged the Otago Provincial Council during the 1860s to set aside a land endowment for an institute of higher education. An ordinance of the council established the university in 1869, giving it  of land and the power to grant degrees in Arts, Medicine, Law and Music. Burns was named Chancellor but he did not live to see the university open on 5 July 1871.

The university conferred just one degree, to Alexander Watt Williamson, before becoming an affiliated college of the federal University of New Zealand in 1874. With the dissolution of the University of New Zealand in 1961 and the passage of the University of Otago Amendment Act 1961, the university resumed its power to confer degrees.

Originally operating from William Mason's Post Office building on Princes Street, it relocated to Maxwell Bury's Clocktower and Geology buildings in 1878 and 1879. This evolved into the Clocktower complex, a striking group of Gothic revival buildings at the heart of the campus. These buildings were inspired by the then-new main building at the University of Glasgow in Scotland.

Otago was the first university in Australasia to permit women to take a law degree. Ethel Benjamin graduated LLB in 1897. Later that year she became the first woman in the British Empire to appear as counsel in court.

The Otago University helped train medical personnel as part of the Otago University Medical Corps. They supplied or trained most of the New Zealand Army's doctors and dentists during the First World War.

Professor Robert Jack made the first radio broadcast in New Zealand from the physics department on 17 November 1921.

Queen Elizabeth II visited the university library with the Duke of Edinburgh on 18 March 1970. This was the first time the royals completed informal "walkabouts" to meet the public, and it was the first visit of Prince Charles (then 21 years old) and Princess Anne (19 years) to this country.

Because it had a wide range of courses, Otago attracted more students from outside its provincial district. This led to the growth of colleges and informal accommodation in north Dunedin around the faculty buildings. This development of a residential campus gave Otago a more vibrant undergraduate student life at the same time as comparable but smaller developments in Christchurch, Wellington and Auckland were eclipsed in the late 20th century. Otago now has the most substantial residential campus of any university in New Zealand or Australia, although this is not without its problems.

In May 2010 University joined the Matariki Network of Universities (MNU) together with Dartmouth College (US), Durham University (UK), Queen's University (Canada), University of Tübingen (Germany), University of Western Australia (Australia) and Uppsala University (Sweden).

In December 2020, eight graduation ceremonies scheduled for that month were disrupted following threats to carry out a firearms and explosives attack on students attending graduation ceremonies scheduled for 7 and 8 December. On 18 December, a 22-year-old woman appeared in the Auckland District Court on charges of threatening harm to people or property. Court documents have described the threat as being of a "magnitude surpassing the March 15 Christchurch mosque massacres." On 14 July, the woman, who has interim name suppression, admitted to threatening to carry out a firearms and explosives attack against Otago students. Her lawyer has applied for a discharge without conviction.

Coat of arms

Campuses

The University of Otago's main campus is in Dunedin, which hosts the Central Administration as well as its Health Sciences, Humanities, Business School, and Sciences divisions. In addition, the university has four satellite campuses in Auckland, Wellington, Christchurch, and Invercargill.

The Christchurch campus is based at the Christchurch School of Medicine and Health Science. It also provides medical and physiotherapy clinical training programs, research, distance education, and postgraduate programs.
The Wellington campus is based at the Wellington School of Medicine and Health Science. It also provides medical and physiotherapy clinical training programs, research, distance education, and postgraduate programs.
The Auckland campus is based at the Auckland Centre on Queen. The Auckland Centre provides various teaching and distance learning courses and serves as a liaison with the wider Auckland community and alumni.
The Southland Campus (Ahuahu Te Mātauranga) is a branch of the University of Otago College of Education. The campus provides a range of early childhood, primary, primary bilingual, and secondary teacher education programs.
The University of Otago's Department of Marine Science also operates the Portobello Marine Laboratory in the Otago peninsula.

Merger with Dunedin College of Education
The University of Otago and the Dunedin College of Education (a specialist teacher training institution) merged on 1 January 2007. The University of Otago College of Education is now based on the college site, and includes the college's campuses in Invercargill and Alexandra. Staff of the university's Faculty of Education relocated to the college site. A merger had been considered before, however the present talks progressed further, and more amicably, than previously.

Libraries

The University of Otago has ten libraries: seven based in Dunedin on the main university campus, the education library in Southland, plus two medical libraries in Wellington and Christchurch. All libraries have wireless access.

Central Library
The Central Library is part of the Information Services Building and has over 2000 study spaces, 130 computer terminals, and laptop connections at 500 desks. It has Te Aka a Tāwhaki, a collection of Māori resources, and the Special Collections consisting of about 9,000 books printed before 1801. In total, the Central Library has over 800,000 print and electronic materials relating to the arts and humanities, commerce, education, physical education, social sciences, and technology. It was designed by the American architecture firm Hardy Holzman Pfeiffer and opened in 2001, replacing what was previously a 1960s-era modernist building.

Robert Stout Law Library
The Robert Stout Law Library is the university's law library and is based in the Richardson Building.

Health Sciences Library
The Health Sciences Library is in the Sayers Building, opposite the main entrance to Dunedin Hospital. The Health Sciences Library book collection only includes the last 10 years of content, but does have over 150,000 volumes, the vast majority of which are in storage. There is seating for over 400.

Science Library
The Science Library is at the north end of the campus in the Science III building, with seating for approximately 500.

Hocken Collections
The Hocken Collections is a research library, archive, and art gallery of national significance which is administrated by the University of Otago. The library's specialist areas include items relating to the history of New Zealand and the Pacific, with specific emphasis on the Otago and Southland regions. The Hocken Collections was established in 1910 when Dunedin philanthropist Thomas Hocken donated his entire private collection to the University of Otago. It currently houses over 8,000 linear metres of archives and manuscripts. It is currently situated at the site of the former Otago Co-operative Dairy Company factory on Anzac Avenue, east of the main campus.

Robertson Library
The Robertson Library is the university's education library and is jointly run by the University of Otago's College of Education and Otago Polytechnic, which is also located near the university's Dunedin campus.

Other libraries
The Wellington Medical and Health Sciences Library and the Canterbury Medical Library provide services to University of Otago students and staff, and the staff of the local District Health Boards. The university's Southland Campus also has a library.

Organisation and administration

The university is divided into four academic divisions: 
 Division of Humanities
 Division of Health Sciences
 Division of Sciences
 Otago Business School
For external and marketing purposes, the Division of Commerce is known as the Otago Business School, as that is the term commonly used for its equivalent in North America. Historically, there were a number of schools and faculties, which have now been grouped with stand alone departments to form these divisions.

In addition to the usual university disciplines, the University of Otago Medical School (founded 1875) is one of only two medical schools in New Zealand (with component schools in Dunedin, Christchurch and Wellington); and Otago is the only university in the country to offer training in Dentistry. Other professional schools and faculties not found in all New Zealand universities include Pharmacy, Physical Education, Physiotherapy, Medical Laboratory Science, and Surveying. It was also home to the School of Mines, until this was transferred to the University of Auckland in 1987. Theology is also offered, traditionally in conjunction with the School of Ministry, Knox College, and Holy Cross College, Mosgiel.

There are also a number of service divisions including:
 External Engagement Division
 Financial Services Division
 Human Resources Division
 Information Technology Services Division
 Property Services Division
 Research & Enterprise Division
 Student Services Division

Student body

Admissions

Academics

Distinctions

Many Fellowships add to the diversity of the people associated with "Otago". They include:
 Robert Burns Fellowship (literature)
 Caroline Plummer Fellowship in Community Dance
 Charles Hercus Fellowship
 Claude McCarthy Fellowship
 Foxley Fellowship
 Frances Hodgkins Fellowship (art)
 Henry Lang Fellowship
 Hocken Fellowship
 James Cook Fellowship
 Mozart Fellowship (music)
 THB Symons Fellowship
 William Evans Visiting Fellowship

In 1998, the physics department gained some fame for making the first Bose–Einstein condensate in the Southern Hemisphere.

The 2006 Government investigation into research quality (to serve as a basis for future funding) ranked Otago the top University in New Zealand overall, taking into account the quality of its staff and research produced. It was also ranked first in the categories of Clinical Medicine, Biomedical Science, Law, English Literature and Language, History and Earth Science. The Department of Philosophy received the highest score for any nominated academic unit. Otago had been ranked fourth in the 2004 assessment.

In 2006, a report released by the Ministry of Research, Science and Technology found that Otago was the most research intensive university in New Zealand, with 40% of staff time devoted to research and development.

Journal "Science" has recommended worldwide study of Otago's Biochemistry database "Transterm", which has genomic data on 40,000 species.

Rankings

The University of Otago is consistently ranked in the top 1% of universities in the world. The University has also been rated 5-Stars Plus by QS Stars in the QS World University Rankings. This is the maximum rating achievable under the QS Stars System, which takes into account the quality of Otago’s facilities, teaching, graduate employability, internationalisation, and inclusiveness. 
Besides having 5 subjects in the top 50 in the world,  the University of Otago has 10 subjects ranked between 51st and 100th in QS World University Rankings. As well as having 15 subjects in the top 100 in the world, Otago has another 7 subjects in the top 101 to 150 band, and 6 subjects in the top 151 to 200 band. In 2015, the University of Otago became the first New Zealand university to have a course in a QS Top 10 list, being ranked 8th in Dentistry.

Residential colleges

The University of Otago owns, or is in affiliation with, fourteen residential colleges, which provide food, accommodation, social and welfare services. Most of these cater primarily for first year students, though some have a sizable number of second and higher year undergraduates, as well as occasionally a significant postgraduate population. While some teaching is normally undertaken at a college, this generally represents a small percentage of a resident's formal tuition.

Most colleges actively seek to foster a sense of community and academic achievement amongst their members through, variously, intercollegiate competitions, communal dining, apartment groups, traditionalism, independent students' clubs, college events and internal sporting and cultural societies.

The colleges are geographically spread over the Dunedin urban area:

 Aquinas College
 Arana College
 Caroline Freeman College
 Carrington College
 Cumberland College
 Hayward College
 Knox College
 Salmond College
 Selwyn College
 St Margaret's College
 Studholme College
 Te Rangi Hiroa College
 Toroa College
 University College

In mid October 2019, the University of Otago announced that it would be building a new 450-room residential college called Te Rangi Hiroa, which will replace the current Te Rangi Hiroa College along Cumberland Street. The new college is estimated to cost NZ$90 million and is located on the corner of Albany and Forth Streets near the Dunedin campus.

Student life

O-Week

'O-Week' or Orientation Week is the Otago equivalent of Freshers' Week. New students are most commonly known by their seniors as 'freshers' or simply as 'first-years'. O-week is organised by the Otago University Students' Association and involves competitions such as 'Fresher of the Year' whereby several students volunteer to carry out a series of tasks throughout the week before being voted to win. Other competitions include that of different faculties facing off with each other. The OUSA also organises events each night including various concerts, a comedy night, hypnotist plus bigger events at Forsyth Barr Stadium. Typically there is a Highlanders rugby game scheduled during the week. Local bars organise events also with a range of live music and promotional deals. Historically events have included the Cookathon and a Miss O-Week competition hosted by The Outback. The Cookathon was held by a local pub (the Cook) with the premise that your first drink costs you about $20 which gives you a t-shirt, three meal vouchers and reduced price on drinks then you spend the rest of the day binge drinking and 'telephoning' the occasional jug with mates.
Traditions
Each year the first years are encouraged to attend the toga parade and party dressed in white sheets wrapped as togas. Retailers called for an end of the parade after property damage and disorder during the 2009 event. However, the OUSA took it upon themselves to reintroduce this tradition, with a festival like event taking place at the stadium. 2012 Toga Party saw an unofficial world record. A clocktower race also occurs, in the style of Chariots of Fire. Students must race round the tower and attached building, beginning on the first chime of the clock at noon and completing before the chimes cease. Unlike Chariots of Fire, the task is possible with a couple of students completing each year.

Behavioural issues
Student behaviour is a major concern for both the university administration and Dunedin residents in general. Concerns over student behaviour prompted the university to introduce a Code of Conduct (CoC) which its students must abide by in 2007. The introduction of the CoC was accompanied by the establishment of the dedicated 'Campus Watch' security force to keep tabs on crime and anti-social behaviour on campus and in the student neighbourhoods nearby. Campus Watch reports directly to the university's Proctor.

Riots
Riots took place in 2006, 2007, 2008 and 2009 related to events surrounding the Undie 500 car rally organised by students from Canterbury University. Other student social events during the year such as the Toga Parade and the Hyde Street Keg Race are also notable for attracting police attention, but not to the scale of the Undie riots. In 2012 there were 80 people treated by emergency services and 15 arrests by police after the Hyde Street party went out of control.

Protest
Otago students are notable for protesting over contentious political issues in nearly every decade. In the 1960s students at Otago who were involved with the Progressive Youth Movement led protests against the Vietnam War. In the 1960s mixed flatting (males and females were prohibited from sharing housing up to that time) was contested in various creative ways by Otago students. On 28 September 1993 Otago students protested against a fee increase at the University Registry (Clocktower Building), which ended in a violent clash with police. In the lead up to the 1996 general election students trying to stop a 25% fee increase occupied the University Registry (Clocktower Building) for over a week (which was followed by similar occupations at campuses around the country), fee increases were limited to 17%. Since 2004, the Otago University NORML club, led by Abe Gray, met weekly on the Otago campus to protest by smoking cannabis in defiance of New Zealand's cannabis laws. In 2008, several members were arrested and issued with trespass notices banning them from the Union Lawn.

Notable people

Chancellors
The following is a list of chancellors of the University of Otago.

The following is a list of vice-chancellors of the university:

Faculty

Muriel Bell, nutritionist and medical researcher
Agnes Blackie, first female physics academic
Robert J. T. Bell, mathematician
Noel Benson, geologist
Carolyn Burns, Marsden Medal winning zoologist
Jennie Connor Medicine
Alice Copping, nutritionist
Alison Cree, herpetologist
Marie Crowe, psychotherapy academic
John Crump, infectious diseases specialist
Michael Cullen, politician
Catherine Day, biochemist
Sarah Derrett, injury prevention specialist
John Carew Eccles, medical researcher
Norman Lowther Edson, biochemistry
Solomon Faine, microbiologist
J.N. Findlay, philosopher
Jim Flynn, intelligence researcher and political philosopher
Abe Gray, founder of the Whakamana Cannabis Museum, high-profile cannabis activist and protester for almost two decades
David Harris, software developer
Janet Hoek, public health
Christina Hulbe, Antarctic researcher, glaciologist
Keith Hunter, Marsden Medal winning marine chemist
Robert Jack, physicist
Leopold Kirschner, bacteriologist 
Pat Langhorne, physicist
Raechel Laing, clothing and textiles researcher
J. L. Mackie, philosopher
Brian John Marples (1907–1967), Professor of Zoology 1937–1967
Alan Musgrave, philosopher of science
Lisa Matisoo-Smith, Professor of Biological Anthropology and Head of the Department of Anatomy
Pauline Norris, pharmacy professor
Patricia Priest, epidemiologist and professor of public health
Elaine Reese, psychology professor
Christina Riesselman, paleoceanographer
Bridget Robinson, Mackenzie Chair in Cancer Medicine
Abigail Smith, professor in marine sciences
David Skegg, epidemiologist
Rachael Taylor
Virginia Toy, geology
Gillian Whalley, medical research

Alumni
 (with residential college, if any, in parentheses where known)

Arthur Henry Adams, journalist and writer
Barbara Anderson, novelist
Rui Maria de Araújo, Prime Minister of Timor-Leste
Annette Baier, moral philosopher
Rayyanah Barnawi, Saudi astronaut
Muriel Bell, nutritionist and medical researcher
David Benson-Pope, politician
W. D. Borrie, demographer
Christine Jensen Burke, mountain climber
Dame Silvia Cartwright, Governor General
Brian Christie, neuroscientist
Nathan Cohen, world champion and Olympic champion rower
John Coverdale, academic psychiatrist
John Crump, infectious diseases specialist
David Cunliffe (Carrington), politician
Helen Danesh-Meyer, ophthalmology academic
Thomas Davis, politician, diplomat and researcher
Glen Denham, Tall Black
Derek Denny-Brown
Sarah Derrett, injury prevention specialist
Archibald Durward FRSE, anatomist
Marc Ellis (University College), All Black

Bill English (Selwyn), 39th Prime Minister of New Zealand
Solomon Faine, microbiologist
Janet Frame, writer
Ian Fraser, broadcaster
Caroline Freeman, first female graduate of the University of Otago
William Fyfe, geochemist
Jon Gadsby, comedian and actor
John Gallas, poet and educator
Abe Gray, founder of the Whakamana Cannabis Museum, high-profile cannabis activist and protester for almost two decades
Sir Harold Delf Gillies, plastic surgeon
Sir Malcolm Grant (Selwyn), lawyer and Vice-Chancellor of University College London (2003–13); subsequently Chairman of NHS England and Chancellor of the University of York
Stephen Guest, legal academic
Geoffrey Harding OAM, medical practitioner
Graeme Hart, businessman
Volker Heine, physicist
Jan Hellriegel, singer/songwriter
Greg Henderson, cyclist
Sir Peter Buck, doctor, military leader, health administrator, politician, anthropologist and museum director.
Brent Hodge (Cumberland), director

Fergus Hume, novelist
David Kirk (Selwyn), All Black captain and businessman
Josh Kronfeld (Aquinas College), All Black
Chris Laidlaw, All Black and politician
Samuelu Laloniu, Permanent Representative of Tuvalu to the United Nations
Michael Laws, (Arana) politician, writer, broadcaster
Tania Lineham, science teacher, winner of the Prime Minister's Science Teacher Prize, 2015
John Edward "Jack" Lovelock, athlete
Chris Mahony, World Bank professional, University of Oxford doctorate, athlete
Dee Mangin, David Braley Nancy Gordon Chair in Family Medicine at McMaster University
Kamisese Mara (Knox), politician
Diana Martin, microbiologist in New Zealand (1942–2019)
Stella Maxwell, fashion model
Dame Judith Mayhew Jonas, businesswoman
Archibald McIndoe, plastic surgeon
Joseph William Mellor, chemist
James S. Milne, mathematician
Arnold Nordmeyer, politician
Christopher Norton, composer
Anton Oliver (University College), Captain of the All Blacks
Prof. Datuk Dr. Mazlan Othman, astrophysicist, Director of the United Nations Office for Outer Space Affairs

Lord Porritt (Selwyn), Olympian, physician to the Queen and Governor General
Arthur Prior, philosopher
Lauren Kim Roche, physician and author
Emily Siedeberg, first female medical graduate
Penny Simmonds, politician
Robert Stout (Aquinas), Prime Minister of New Zealand
Sulaiman Daud, politician
Sione Tapa, Tongan Minister of Health
Peter Tapsell, politician
Pobert H Wade LSE Professor
Jeremy Waldron, legal philosopher
Murray Webb, cricketer and caricaturist
Bridget Williams, publisher
Allan Wilson, molecular biologist

Rhodes Scholars

list of Rhodes Scholars:

(College at Oxford in brackets)(Source: List of NZ Rhodes Scholars)

See also

University of Otago School of Performing Arts and Allen Hall Theatre
List of Honorary Doctors of the University of Otago
Scarfies

References

External links

 University of Otago homepage
 Otago University Students' Association
 OUSA Clubs and Societies Centre
 General outline of Burns, Hodgkins, and Mozart Fellowships
 About the Bose–Einstein Condensate
 University of Otago alumni profiles

 
1869 establishments in New Zealand
Otago, University of
Education in Dunedin